Tommi Huhtala (born December 7, 1987) is a Finnish professional ice hockey left winger who currently plays for Kiekko-Espoo in the Mestis.

Playing career
He previously played with Espoo Blues of the Liiga. On April 7, 2014, Huhtala left the Blues to sign a two-year contract with fellow Finnish club, Jokerit for their inaugural Kontinental Hockey League season in 2014–15.

After four seasons in the KHL with Jokerit, Huhtala left as a free agent to sign a two-year contract with German outfit, Adler Mannheim of the DEL, on April 13, 2018.

Awards and honours

References

External links

Living people
1987 births
Adler Mannheim players
Ässät players
Espoo Blues players
HV71 players
Ilves players
Jokerit players
Ice hockey people from Tampere
Finnish ice hockey left wingers
Finnish expatriate ice hockey players in Germany